Murray MacLaren  (April 30, 1861 – December 24, 1942) was a Canadian politician and the 18th Lieutenant Governor of New Brunswick.

Born in Richibucto, New Brunswick, he was a physician before being elected to the House of Commons of Canada representing the New Brunswick riding of St. John—Albert in the 1921 federal election. A Conservative, he was re-elected in 1925, 1926, and 1930. From 1930 to 1934, he was the Minister of Pensions and National Health. From 1935 to 1940, he was the Lieutenant-Governor of New Brunswick.  He died in 1942 in Saint John, New Brunswick.

External links
 
 MacLaren Residence historicplaces.ca
 
 

1861 births
1942 deaths
Conservative Party of Canada (1867–1942) MPs
Lieutenant Governors of New Brunswick
Members of the House of Commons of Canada from New Brunswick
Members of the King's Privy Council for Canada
Companions of the Order of St Michael and St George
Fellows of the American College of Surgeons